Phoenix Raei is an Australian actor, director and producer of Persian descent. Raei, who was born in Shiraz in Iran, immigrated to Australia as a child. In 2019, he was the recipient of the Casting Guild of Australia, Rising Star Award. In 2021, he starred in the Netflix series Clickbait.
He was a main cast member of the Perth two season TV soap The Heights (2018-2019).

Early life 
Raei was born in Shiraz. He immigrated with his family to Australia and settled in Perth. He showed interest in acting at an early age, but he felt pressured to pursue higher education and studied law.

Acting and film career
Raei first appeared in a short film in 2014. He chose the stage name Nima Raei and used it for Seven Storeys Down, a 2017 film that he wrote and directed. Raei's TV debut was in the Australian soccer show Mustangs FC, He played his first major role in the 2017 film Australia Day, and wrote and directed a miniseries, Murder. He thereafter relocated to Melbourne. In 2018, Raei appeared in Australian political thriller Romper Stomper. In 2019 he featured in the Australian crime-drama series Wentworth; that same year he was awarded the Casting Guild of Australia Rising Star Award. In 2020, he appeared in Stateless, a series about detention centers in Australia created by Cate Blanchett. Raei also co-starred in the 2021 Netflix series Clickbait alongside Zoe Kazan, Betty Gabriel, and Adrian Grenier. In Clickbait, Raei plays the role of Roshan Amiri, a missing persons detective investigating a highly publicized murder. He is set to appear in Black Site, an American action-thriller film scheduled for release in 2022, and he is working on a self-authored, directed, and produced film, Schnook.

Personal life 
Raei is engaged to Australian actress Kate Lister. The two collaborated in various previous projects, and they manage a production company, Little Fish Films together.

References

External links
 

21st-century Australian actors
Living people
Iranian emigrants to Australia
People from Shiraz
Male actors from Perth, Western Australia
Edith Cowan University alumni
1985 births